Borrowdale is a residential suburb in the north of Harare, Zimbabwe, which ranks among the most affluent and prestigious residential areas in the country. It forms part of the Northeast suburbs of the city of Harare, with a population of 20,312 as of the Zimbabwe 2012 Census.

Borrowdale is home to many notable schools, institutions, an arena, a pool, libraries and a number of parks and the prestigious Borrowdale Race Course. Traditionally, the community of Borrowdale has been a wealthy and predominantly white, anglophone enclave, having been at one point the richest community in Zimbabwe. It now competes with other neighbourhoods such as of Glen Lorne, Chisipite, Gunhill, Hogerty Hill, and Borrowdale Brooke, for the title.

The area is made up of the sub-neighbourhoods of Helensvale, Borrowdale Brooke, Philadelphia, Balentien Park, Crowhill Views, Unidale and Pomona. The suburb has numerous high-end shopping areas such Sam Levy's Village and Borrowdale Brooke Centre. The area is one of the most sought after and expensive places to live in Harare. There are private schools within the area which include St. John's College, St. John's Preparatory School and The Heritage School.

History
Borrowdale was named after an early merchant named Henry Borrow. Borrow set up the area as an estate that combined residential and farming areas. The estate consisted of 22,275 hectares of land spreading out northwards. The estate was purchased at the price of 17.5 cents per hectare. Borrow worked with his colleagues Heany and Johnson to produce vegetables and other products on the farm.

Borrow built a dam on the Borrowdale Brooke river in 1892 – the first in Rhodesia – and started to grow a variety of crops for the nascent town. The dam was used for many years for irrigation but was subsequently destroyed in 1939 after serious flooding.

In 1897, the area was acquired by United Goldfields Company which briefly ventured into livestock production but the enterprise was a failure. The area was then developed into residential plots and this resulted in the emergence of residential estates such as Helensvale, Hatcliffe, Greystone Park, Quinnington, and Glen Forest.

During the twentieth century, Borrowdale became a wealthy suburb; a then wooded, residential enclave dotted with many green spaces. It is known for its notable residents including many members of parliament, intellectuals, business people, ambassadors, and other professionals. The list included the former president Robert Mugabe whose home is known as the "Blue Roof," one of the largest properties in the area.

Character
Borrowdale is one of Harare's most exclusive residential neighborhoods. The neighbourhood is situated at a higher altitude than areas to the south with a number of gently rolling hills, parks, and the Borrowdale Brooke stream. Borrowdale's shops, schools and recreational facilities are located the southern part of the suburb. The majority of residents in this neighborhood own several properties either abroad or in rural parts of the country such as, the Mazowe Valley, Mashonaland East and the scenic Eastern Highlands region near Mutare.

The shops and restaurants in the Sam Levy's Village and Borrowdale Road area, are well patronized by Borrowdale residents. This shopping district includes clothing stores, sporting goods stores, gyms, gift shops, bakeries, restaurants and cafes.

Notable institutions located in or adjacent to Borrowdale are the Borrowdale Brooke Golf Club, and Borrowdale Country Club.

Homes
Borrowdale's houses include a variety of architectural styles including English Cottage, Tudor Revival, Cape Dutch, and modern postwar designs. Most of these homes were built between the late 1940s and 1980s. Since the late 2000s, the area has become the leading destination for non-resident Zimbabwean and foreign buyers, driving up prices far beyond average incomes and accessible to only the wealthiest of local residents. As a result of the new development, parts of Borrowdale have been redeveloped with larger houses which do not match the scale of the original housing in the neighbourhood.

In the first part of 2018, the average resale house price in the neighborhood was $530,036, higher than any Harare neighborhood other than Hogerty Hill and Borrowdale Brooke.

By the mid-2010s, the number of people squatting in informal settlements was growing.

Cityscape

Most of the area is residential. Homes increase in size and value toward the north, with the largest and most expensive being on its northern fringes towards Hogerty Hill and Shawasha Hills.

There are several small commercial districts such as Sam Levy's Village from the areas's western boundary, Rowland Square in central Borrowdale and Borrowdale Brook Centre to the northeast of the suburbs.

Borrowdale Adjacent or Borrowdale West is a term applied by realtors to a districts of Pomona and Rolf and Colne Valleys in order to promote these areas as matching Borrowdale's affluence and desirability to outsiders.

Parks
There are several parks within Borrowdale, including Ballantyne and Greystone Park (not to be confused with the neighbourhood of the same name). A scenic woodland area is located at Sandringham Drive, within ZimParks and Shire Gardens.

Education
Throughout the 20th century, the concentration of wealth in Borrowdale sparked the growth of many prestigious public and private schools in and around the neighborhood. One of the first schools was the St. John's College.

Borrowdale is also home to several private schools, including, Westminster International, Borrowdale Academy, St. John's College, St. John's Preparatory School, St. George's College, Harare, Hartmann House Preparatory School and The Heritage School, Zimbabwe.

Sports
Borrowdale is home to Borrowdale Race Course, the third ground in Zimbabwe to be built specifically for horse racing. It is one of the most prestigious race courses in Zimbabwe and it hosts a number of international competitions such as the OK Grand Challenge run by OK Zimbabwe Limited. The Castle Tankard, which is the oldest horse race competition in Zimbabwe, is one of the major annual events which takes place at race course which is located on the heart of Borrowdale.

Other amenities include, a half Olympic swimming pool, cricket grounds, refurbished tennis courts, and acres of green space. Borrowdale is also home to St. John's College, which has produced a disproportionate number of the country's cricket and rugby players, through its high school teams known as the Rams.

Borrowdale is also home to one of the oldest active rugby clubs in Southern Africa, Old Georgians Rugby Club.

Borrowdale is the birthplace of tennis star siblings, Wayne Black, Cara Black and Byron Black.

References

Suburbs of Harare
Harare